The Snow Maiden: A Spring Fairy Tale is an opera in four acts with a prologue by Nikolai Rimsky-Korsakov, composed during 1880–1881.

The Snow Maiden may also refer to:
The Snow Maiden, an 1873 play by Aleksander Ostrovsky, which inspired the opera
"The Snow Maiden", incidental music composed in 1873 by Pyotr Ilyich Tchaikovsky for the first production of the play
The Snow Maiden (1952 film), an animated film based on the opera
The Snow Maiden (1968 film), a 1968 live-action film based on the play, directed by Pavel Kadochnikov
The Snow Maiden (2006 film), animated film, winner of Best Animation at the 12th Open Russian Festival of Animated Film

See also
Snow Maiden (disambiguation)